San Giorgio this name has been borne by at least three ships of the Italian Navy and may refer to:

 , a  launched in 1908 and scuttled in 1941.
 , launched in 1941 as the  Pompeo Magno she was rebuilt as a destroyer and renamed in 1955. She was decommissioned in 1980
 , a  launched in 1987. 

Italian Navy ship names